Angela Maria Lambert (née Helps; 14 April 1940 – 26 September 2007) was a British journalist, art critic, and author. She is best known for her novels A Rather English Marriage and Kiss and Kin, the latter of which won the Romantic Novel of the Year Award.

Biography 
Lambert was born Angela Maria Helps to an English civil servant and a German-born housewife. She was unhappy when sent to Wispers School, a girls' boarding school in Sussex, where by the age of 12 she had decided that she wanted to be a writer. She went to St Hilda's College, Oxford, where she read politics, philosophy and economics.

In 1962, she married Martin Lambert, they had a son and a daughter, and the union ended five years later, when he left her with two young children to support. Later she also had another daughter with  the Hungarian-born writer Stephen Vizinczey.

She began her career as a journalist in 1969, working for ITN before joining The Independent newspaper in 1988.

Lambert suffered multiple immune disorders and hepatitis C (caught from a blood transfusion) which led to cirrhosis of the liver. Having survived a critical illness in February 2006, she never quite recovered, and became increasingly disabled. She lived in London and France (having bought a house in the Dordogne in 1972). She was survived by her partner of 21 years, television director Tony Price, and her three children.

Works

Novels 
 Love Among the Single Classes (1989)
 No Talking After Lights (1990)
 A Rather English Marriage (1992)
 The Constant Mistress (1994)
 Kiss and Kin (1997)
 Golden Lads and Girls (1999)
 The Property of Rain (2001)

Non-fiction 
 Unquiet Souls: A Social History of the Illustrious, Irreverent, Intimate Group of British Aristocrats Known As "the Souls" (1987)
 1939: The Last Season of Peace (1989)
 The Lost Life of Eva Braun (2006)

References

External links 
Obituary
Obituary in The Times, 27 September 2007
Romaunce Books

1940 births
2007 deaths
Alumni of St Hilda's College, Oxford
ITN newsreaders and journalists
English journalists
English non-fiction writers
Writers from London
People educated at Wispers School
RoNA Award winners
20th-century English novelists
21st-century British novelists
20th-century English women writers
21st-century English women writers
Women romantic fiction writers
English women novelists
English women non-fiction writers
British women television journalists
20th-century British businesspeople